The Best Smooth Jazz... Ever! vol. 2 is a compilation album released by EMI in 2005.

Track listing

CD 1
Nina Simone – "My Baby Just Cares for Me"
Nat King Cole – "Let There Be Love"
Shirley Bassey – "(Where Do I Begin?) Love Story"
Cassandra Wilson – "Fragile"
Mama Cass – "Dream a Little Dream of Me"
Jackie DeShannon – "What the World Needs Now Is Love"
Crystal Gayle – "Don't It Make My Brown Eyes Blue"
Bobbie Gentry – "I'll Never Fall in Love Again"
Eliane Elias – "Girl From Ipanema"
Julie London – "Go Slow"
Dinah Washington – "Call Me Irresponsible"
Alma Cogan – "Somebody Loves Me"
Rodney Jones – "Ain't No Sunshine"
Dusty Springfield – "The Look of Love"
Ilya – "Bellissimo"

CD 2
Peggy Lee – "Fever"
Dionne Warwick – "Walk On By"
Dean Martin – "Sway"
Aretha Franklin – "I Say a Little Prayer"
Kay Starr – "I Cry By Night"
Norah Jones – "Come Away with Me"
Joss Stone – "The Chokin' Kind"
Nat King Cole – "Bidin' My Time"
Nancy Wilson – "The Nearness of You"
Les Baxter – "Unchained Melody"
George Michael – "My Baby Just Cares for Me"
Angela McCluskey – "I Came Aching"
Randy Crawford – "Rainy Night in Georgia"
Bryan Ferry – "Falling in Love Again"
Dianne Reeves – "In a Sentimental Mood"

CD 3
Louis Armstrong – "What a Wonderful World"
Julie London – "When I Fall in Love"
Cassandra Wilson – "Tupelo Honey"
Peggy Lee – "You're Getting to Be a Habit with Me"
Dinah Shore – "The Man I Love"
Be – "Hey – It's a Perfect Day"
Flabby – "Mambo Italiano"
Tab Two – "Let It Flow"
Gabin feat. Stefano Di Battista – "Doo Uap, Doo Uap, Doo Uap"
Nicola Conte – "Sea And Sand"
Eliane Elias – "I Fall in Love Too Easily"
Sarah Vaughan – "All or Nothing"
Lena Horne, Ray Ellis & Orchestra – "In Love in Vain"
Bettye LaVette – "Let Me Down Easy"
Laima – "What's Forever"

CD 4
Gabin – "La Maison"
Ive Mendes – "If You Leave Me Now"
Beady Belle – "Game"
US3 – "Come On Everybody (Get Down)"
Flabby – "Jazz 4 Two"
Etta James – "I Just Wanna Make Love to You"
Lou Rawls & Dianne Reeves – "At Last"
Nancy Wilson – "All Night Long"
Holly Cole – "Make It Go Away"
Bonnie Raitt – "I Can't Make You Love Me"
Dinah Washington – "Drinkin' Again"
Nina Simone – "Wild Is the Wind"
Peggy Lee – "As Time Goes By"
Julie London – "The Thrill Is Gone"
Jimmy Smith – "Summertime"

Charts

References
  

Smooth Jazz
2005 compilation albums
Smooth jazz compilation albums